Jae-gyun Hwang (born July 28, 1987) is a South Korean professional baseball infielder for the KT Wiz of the KBO League. He previously played for the Hyundai Unicorns, Nexen Heroes, and Lotte Giants. Hwang has also played for the San Francisco Giants of Major League Baseball (MLB).

Career

Hyundai Unicorns/Nexen Heroes
Hwang made his KBO League debut in Hyundai Unicorns in 2007. The team folded after his rookie season, and became the Nexen Heroes, for whom he played from 2008–2010.

Lotte Giants
The Heroes traded Hwang to the Lotte Giants from 2010, and he continued to play for the Giants through the 2016 season. Hwang attracted international attention for a bat flip in July 2015, after he hit a game-tying home run in the ninth inning against the NC Dinos.

In October 2015, Hwang announced that he had asked the Giants to post him for transfer to Major League Baseball (MLB) in the United States. His teammate, Ah-seop Son, also asked to be posted. No MLB team placed a bid for Hwang.

San Francisco Giants

After becoming a free agent after the 2016 season, Hwang sought a contract with an MLB franchise. On January 23, 2017, the San Francisco Giants announced they had signed Hwang to a minor league contract with an invitation to spring training for a chance to make the major league roster. Hwang began the season with the Sacramento River Cats of the Class AAA Pacific Coast League on April 8, 2017. In late June, Hwang told the Giants that he would use the opt-out clause in his contract and become a free agent if he was not called up to the major leagues by July 1. He had batted .287 with seven home runs and 44 RBIs, splitting his time between third and first base, before the Giants promoted Hwang to the major leagues. Hwang debuted for the Giants at third base on June 28. He picked up his first hit, a solo home run, on the same day. On August 31, 2017 Hwang was designated for assignment by the Giants and was outrighted to the Sacramento River Cats, the Giants AAA affiliate. He elected free agency on November 6, 2017.

KT Wiz
On November 12, 2017, Hwang signed a four-year, $7.9 million contract with the KT Wiz. Cho Moo-geun was named as his reward player. On December 27, 2021, Hwang re-signed with the Wiz on a four-year, $5.1 million contract.

Personal life 
On February 10, 2022, Hwang announced in a handwritten letter via personal SNS that he and singer-actress Park Ji-yeon, will get married in the winter of this year. They married in a private ceremony on December 10 at Shilla Hotel. The ceremony was attended by the couple's closest family and friends, and IU sang the congratulatory song.

International career 
He represented South Korea at the 2014 Asian Games, 2015 WBSC Premier12 and 2018 Asian Games.

Television appearances
2021, King of Mask Singer (MBC): Contestant as "Mr. Bean" (episode 289)

References

External links

Career statistics and player information from the KBO League
Hwang Jae-gyun at Lotte Giants Baseball Club 

1987 births
Asian Games gold medalists for South Korea
Asian Games medalists in baseball
Baseball players at the 2014 Asian Games
Baseball players at the 2018 Asian Games
Baseball players at the 2020 Summer Olympics
Hyundai Unicorns players
KBO League third basemen
KT Wiz players
Kyunggi High School alumni
Living people
Lotte Giants players
Major League Baseball players from South Korea
Major League Baseball third basemen
Medalists at the 2014 Asian Games
Medalists at the 2018 Asian Games
Kiwoom Heroes players
Sacramento River Cats players
San Francisco Giants players
South Korean expatriate baseball players in the United States
Baseball players from Seoul
2015 WBSC Premier12 players
Olympic baseball players of South Korea